José de Santiago Concha y Salvatierra (Lima, Peru, December 1, 1667 –  Lima, Peru, March 11, 1741) was a Spanish politician and Royal Governor of Chile.

He studied in Salamanca, and received the title of Knight of the Order of Calatrava due to his noble lineage.  He later served as a magistrate in Lima, later serving in a somewhat similar capacity as an oidor in the Real Audiencia of Chile from 1709 to 1710.  He then returned to Lima to perform his old duties, until the King named him interim governor of Chile.

Rule in Chile
Santiago Concha arrived in Chile on March 5, 1717, and officially took power on the 20th of the same month.  He took up a long-standing royal order to found settlements, with the goal of grouping inhabitants in determined areas.  Thus, in November he went to the Aconcagua River valley and personally founded the city of Quillota.

In December 1717, he left his temporary post and returned to Lima, where he died a few years later. Philip V granted him the title of Marquis of Casa Concha in 1718 in honor of his service to the crown.

Royal Governors of Chile
Spanish generals
Spanish military personnel
1667 births
1741 deaths